Hokkien is a dialect of Southern Min Chinese spoken in Southern Fujian, Taiwan, Southeast Asia, and elsewhere.

Hokkien may also refer to:
 Min Chinese, the main branch of Chinese in Fujian Province
 Fujian or Hokkien, a province of China
 Hoklo people of Hokkien, a group originating from Fujian province

See also
 Hokkien mee, a noodle dish popular in Southeast Asia